Mill Bay is a small village on Islandmagee in County Antrim, Northern Ireland. It sits by the tiny Carnspindle Bay, within the townland of Carnspindle. It is in the Larne Borough Council area. In the 2011 Census it had a population of 103 people (40 households). (2001 census: 93 people).

Places of interest 
Ballylumford Dolmen, locally known as the "Druid's Altar", is a archeological site where artifacts from an ancient burial chamber have been recovered.

See also 
List of towns and villages in Northern Ireland

References 

Villages in County Antrim
Civil parish of Island Magee